Gaupne Church is a parish church of the Church of Norway in Luster Municipality in Vestland county, Norway. It is located in the village of Gaupne. It is the church for the Gaupne parish which is part of the Sogn prosti (deanery) in the Diocese of Bjørgvin. The yellow, wooden church was built in a long church design in 1907 using plans drawn up by the architect Hans Jacob Sparre. The church seats about 230 people.

History
In the 1890s, the Old Gaupne Church reached the point where it was no longer usable as the main church for the parish. A discussion was held on whether to replace the church or expand and renovate it. The parish hired Hans Jacob Sparre to design the new church and Anders Korsvold was hired as the lead builder. Construction began late in 1905 and the new building was consecrated on 29 August 1907. The old church was turned into a museum and it was taken over by the Society for the Preservation of Ancient Norwegian Monuments in 1909.

See also
List of churches in Bjørgvin

References

Luster, Norway
Churches in Vestland
Long churches in Norway
Wooden churches in Norway
20th-century Church of Norway church buildings
Churches completed in 1907
1907 establishments in Norway